Hiddadura Jude Neil Sriyantha Mendis (Born 25 October 1957), popularly as Sriyantha Mendis, is an actor in Sri Lankan cinema, theater and television. Highly versatile actor from drama to comedy, Mendis has received awards for the Best actor and Best supporting actor on multiple occasions at local award festivals.

Personal life
Mendis was born on 25 October 1957 in Ragama, Sri Lanka as the eldest of a family with three siblings. His father Hiddadura Lazarus Mendis was a time keeper at the Ceylon Transport Board and later became an executive officer at Sri Lanka Ports Authority. His mother Eliadura Karoline Soyza was a teacher at Holy Family Convent, Bambalapitiya as well as practiced music at Haywood. Sriyantha's grandfather Hiddadura Juan Mendis was a devout Catholic. His mother's father was Eliyadura Evgeny Zoysa and his mother was Welisarage Juliana Fernando. Sriyantha's parents were married on October 17, 1956. Sriyantha has one younger brother, Ajith and one younger sister Menik. Sriyantha's father died on July 25, 2007, at the age of 79.

He completed his education at De Mazenod College, Kandana. He did not take part in any aesthetic activities during school times. He is clever at karate during school times. His first teaching appointment was made to Pokuwagonna Maha Vidyalaya, Ganewatta, far from Polgahawela, Kurunegala. On 7 July 1979, he became a science teacher at St. Bernadette's College, Polgahawela. Later, he completed 32 years as a teacher in several schools island-wide.

Mendis is married to Kusum Renu, who is also a renowned actress in Sinhala cinema, stage and television. He met Renu during the stage drama Pandukabhaya in 1984 and the couple married on 25 October 1986 after the proposal in April 1985. The couple has two daughters.

Career
After finishing education, Mendis along with fellow actor Senaka Perera started to produce a stage play Illeesa. In 1979, Sriyantha was introduced to the stage for the first time as the devil in the play Parassa by its producer Rohana Dandeniya. He also had the opportunity to act in Neville Dias Subasinghe's play Manawayo. In November 1979, he acted in another stage play Sathuro produced by doctor Chandrapala, who worked at Ragama rehabilitation hospital. Meanwhile, he wanted to study drama, and met German theater producer Norbert J. Myer. Then he played in Myer's comedy play Ane Abilik. In 1984, he acted in the teledrama Palingu Menike directed by Dhamma Jagoda. The character 'Surasena' was so popular that there were people who imitated the character, behavior and dialogues.

After appearing in his first teledrama Palingu Menike, Sriyantha entered to the silver screen in 1987, through H. D. Premaratne's movie Mangala Thegga. He won the Best Actor Award at the State Drama Festival in 1988 for his role in Mora drama. At the 1996 Youth Drama Festival, he won the Best Actor award for his play Numba Vitharak Thala Elelui. Since then, he became a character actor in television where he made several notable characters in the television serials such as Dǣkæthi Muwahatha, Mihikathagē Daruvō, Ingammāruva, Hiru Sandu Hamuvē, Hiruṭa Muvāven, Mæṇik Nadiya Galā Basī, Bōgala Savundiris, Danḍubasnāmānaya, Chala Achala, Bæddegedara, Nǣdǣyō, Akāla Sandhyā, Weda Hāminē, Ves Muhuṇu, Asalvæsiyō, Viśva Bhū Sankrānthiya, Mayarathna and Ruwan Maliga. In 1996, he won the SIGNIS Award for Best Actor for the character 'Arachchila' in the serial Danḍubasnāmānaya. Sriyantha has won the Best Actor award for his teledramas Sath Gunalankaraya, Dǣkæthi Muwahatha, Bawa Karma and Viśhva Sankrānthiya.

Selected television serials

 1987 – Palingu Menike as Soorasena 
 1990 – Weda Hamine as Dharmapriya 
 1991 – Sandaluthalaya 
 1991 – Dolos Mahe Api
 1993 – Ape Eththo 
 1996 – Nedeyo 
 1996 – Ammai Thaththai 
 1998 – Inganmaruwa 
 1999 – Bonikko 
 1999 – Sudu Mahaththuru 
 1999 – Paravi Dhenuwa as Kalinga 
 1999 – Varana Kambili as Lalith 
 2000 – Sathmahala as Hemantha 
 2000 – Badde Gedara 
 2000 – De Kathi Muwahatha as Jayasekara 
 2000 – Yaddehi Gedara as Randunu Bandara 
 2000 – Bonikko 
 2001 – Wedi Handa 
 2001 – Maayaratna as Maayaratna 
 2002 – Sakva Lihiniyo 
 2002 – Wara Mal 
 2002 – Depath Nai 
 2002 – Pem Piyawara 
 2003 – Bogala Sawundaris as Sawundiris 
 2003 – Mathi Nethi Daa 
 2003 – Hima Varusa 
 2004 – Dhawala Kanya as Percy 
 2004 – Gimhana Tharanaya as Vajira 
 2005 – Pinkada Simona 
 2005 – Suddilage Kathawa 
 2005 – Samanala Yaya 
 2005 – Indrachapa 
 2005 – Wasantha Kusalana 
 2005 – Kinduru Adaviya 
 2006 – Chakraudhaya as Madaatuwe Appuhamy 
 2006 – Heeye Manaya 
 2006 – Ridee Ittankaraya 
 2007 – Satharadenek Senpathiyo 
 2008 – Nil Ahasa Oba as Gurunnanse 
 2009 – Api Api Wage 
 2009 – Sadgunakaraya 
 2009 – Ravana Adaviya 
 2010 – Rosa Katu 
 2010 – Sadisi Tharanaya 
 2010 – Ruwan Maliga as Ranaraja 
 2010 – Sanda Numba Nam 
 2010 – E Brain 
 2011 – Dhawala Kadulla 
 2011 – Monarathenna 
 2011 – Sanda Madiyama 
 2011 – Mathaka Ahasa 
 2012 – Saranganaa 
 2012 – Ridee Siththam 
 2012 – Visula Ahasa Yata 
 2013 – Dhawala Kadulla as Angkutta 
 2015 – Maada Obama Viya 
 2015 – Gini Avi Saha Gini Keli as Thummulle Padme  
 2016 – Vishnu Sankranthiya  
 2016 – Seethala Gini Del  
 2016 – Urumakkarayo  
 2016 – Maada Obama Viya  
 2016 – Chakra  
 2017 – Kutu Kutu Mama  
 2018 – Urumayaka Aragalaya
 2018 – Thriloka 
 2019 – Sanda Hangila 
 2019 – Ran Bedi Minissu as Muthubanda 
 2019 – Sangeethe as Asela 
 2019 – Iththo 
 2019 – Jeewithaya Athi Thura 
 2019 – Deweni Gamana 
 2020 - Api Ape
 2021 - Sakuuge Lokaya 
 2021 - Rehe
 2022 - Lan Wee
 2022 - Bandhana
 2022 - Sangili Kanadarawa as Gurunnanse 
 2022 - Nannaththara 
 Dandubasnamanaya as Arachchila 
 Diyasuliya  
 Dekethi Muwahatha  
 Beddegedara  
 Denuwara Gedara 
 Hansa Pihatu as Gurunnanse  
 Hiruta Muwawen  
 Kavi Kandula  
 Pabalu Menike
 Sagarayak Meda

Selected stage dramas

 Deyyange Punchi Akkaraya
 Gabbara Minisa
 Kema Lasthiyi 
 Maha Samayama
 Mamai Anduwa
 Padada Asapuwa
 Pansa Deke Hansaya
 Raassa Parassa
 Suba Saha Yasa
 Sudu Saha Kalu
 Warna
 Yathuru Hilen Balanna

Filmography

Awards

Youth Services Youth Drama Festival

|-
|| 1981 ||| Numba Witharak Thala Elalui || Best Actor ||

State Drama Festival

|-
|| 1988 ||| Mora|| Best Actor ||

Sumathi Awards
Sumathi Awards

|-
|| 1999 ||| Peoples'vote || Most popular Actor || 
|-
|| 2001 ||| Sanda Amawakai || Best Actor || 
|-
|| 2009 ||| Sathgunakaraya || Best Actor || 
|-
|| 2010 ||| Sadisi Tharanaya || Best Actor || 
|-
|| 2016 ||| Vishnu Sankranthiya || Best Actor ||

Presidential Film Awards
Presidential Film Awards

|-
|| 2006 ||| Bherunda Pakshiya || Best Actor ||

Raigam Tele'es
Raigam Tele'es

|-
|| 2007 ||| Peoples' vote || Most Popular Actor || 
|-
|| 2013 ||| Dhawala Kadulla || Best Actor ||

SIGNIS Salutation Awards Ceremony
SIGNIS Salutation Awards Ceremony

|-
|| 2010 ||| Bambara Walalla || Best Supporting Actor ||

Television State Awards

|-
|| 2013 ||| Dhawala Kadulla || Best Actor ||

References

External links 

 ශ්‍රියන්ත Vs ශ්‍රියන්ත
 කලාව සහ බනිස් අතර වෙනස හඳුනා ගත යුතුයි — ශ්‍රියන්ත මෙන්ඩිස්
 ශි‍්‍රයන්තගේ තැඹිලි ගෙඩියට තිරිමාදුර විදපු හැටි
 කුසුම් හදන සලා­දෙට මම හරිම කැමැ­තියි
 ශ්‍රියන්තට පෙම්වතියක් හිටිය
 තරු ජෝඩු - 04
 කලාව තුළින් ලෝකය දකින්න දරුවාට ඉඩ දෙන්න
 මගේ දෙනෙත් පියවෙන තුරුම මම කලාවේ නිරත වෙනවා
 ධර්මපාල චරිතයට මුලින්ම තෝරාගත්තේ මමයි
 Chat with Sriyantha and Kusum
 End එක මට ටිකක් අවුල්

Sri Lankan male film actors
Sinhalese male actors
Living people
1957 births